Black and Red may refer to:
 "Black and Red", a song by Avail from their 2002 album Front Porch Stories
 Black and Red Press, a radical Marxist printers/publishers group that Fredy Perlman was involved with
Black n' Red, the collection of notepads and journals now owned by Oxford University
A song released in 2019 by Reignwolf

See also
 Red and black (disambiguation)